Aunty is a 1995 Telugu language romantic comedy drama film directed by Mouli. The film stars Jayasudha, Nassar, Anand, Chinna and Raja Ravindra. It is remade into Kannada in 2001 as Aunty Preethse.

Plot
The story revolves around three young men who fall in love with a pretty older woman who had moved into their neighborhood.

Cast
Jayasudha
Nassar
Anand
Chinna
Raja Ravindra
Brahmanandam
Aswini (Rudra)
Kota Shankar Rao
Krishnaveni
Kalpana
Tanikella Bharani

Soundtrack 
Soundtrack was composed by Ramesh.

References

External links

1995 films
Indian romantic comedy films
Telugu films remade in other languages
1990s Telugu-language films
Films scored by Ramesh Vinayakam